Vivian Dsena (born 28 June 1988) is an Indian television actor known for his portrayal of Abhay Raichand in Pyaar Kii Ye Ek Kahani,  Rishabh Kundra in Madhubala - Ek Ishq Ek Junoon and Harman Singh in Shakti - Astitva Ke Ehsaas Ki. He also participated in reality shows like Fear Factor: Khatron Ke Khiladi 7 and Jhalak Dikhla Jaa 8.

Personal life
 
Dsena's mother is Hindu, while his father is a Christian of Portuguese descent.  In an interview he stated that his mother was an athlete and his father a footballer, leading to his passion for football since the age of 10. He is a fan of the football player Lionel Messi.

In 2013, Dsena married his Pyaar Kii Ye Ek Kahaani co-star Vahbiz Dorabjee but the couple filed for divorce in 2016. The divorce was finalized in 2021.

Television

Awards and nominations

See also 

 List of Indian television actors

References

External links

 
 

Living people
Place of birth missing (living people)
Indian male soap opera actors
1988 births
Fear Factor: Khatron Ke Khiladi participants
Male actors from Madhya Pradesh
People from Ujjain
Indian people of Portuguese descent